The James Laughlin Award, formerly the Lamont Poetry Prize, is given annually for a poet's second published book; it is the only major poetry award that honors a second book. The award is given by the Academy of American Poets, and is noted as one of the major prizes awarded to younger poets in the United States.
In 1959, Harvey Shapiro referred to the award as "roughly, a Pulitzer for bardlings."

Laughlin Award Winners (1996–present)
This partial listing is taken from the website of the Academy of American Poets.

Lamont Poetry Selections (1975–1995)

Lamont Poetry Selections (1954–1974)
For the first 20 years, a poet's first published volume was the annual Lamont Poetry Selection.

See also
American poetry
List of literary awards
List of poetry awards
List of years in poetry
List of years in literature

References

American poetry awards
Awards established in 1954
1954 establishments in the United States